Clytia is a genus of hydrozoans belonging to the family Campanulariidae.

The genus has cosmopolitan distribution.

Species:

Clytia ambigua 
Clytia arborescens 
Clytia brevicyatha

References

Campanulariidae
Hydrozoan genera